This is a list of all United States Supreme Court cases from volume 509 of the United States Reports:

External links

1993 in United States case law